Lacistema is a genus of Lacistemataceae consisting of 12 species :

References

Lacistemataceae
Malpighiales genera
Taxonomy articles created by Polbot
Taxa named by Olof Swartz